Jack Coles (1914–1991) was a British composer, arranger and conductor.

Jack Coles may also refer to:

 Jack Coles (footballer) (1886–1951), Australian rules footballer for the Richmond Tigers

See also
 Jack Cole (disambiguation)
 John Cole (disambiguation)